John E. Kutzbach (June 14, 1937 (Reedsburg, Wisconsin) – January 29, 2021 (Madison, Wisconsin)) was a climate scientist who pioneered the use of climate models to investigate the causes and effects of large changes of climate of the past.

Career 
John Elmer Kutzbach was Professor of Atmospheric and Oceanic Sciences at the Nelson Institute for Environmental Studies at the University of Wisconsin–Madison. He was a former Director and a Senior Scientist in the Center for Climatic Research (UW-Madison).

Kutzbach earned an undergraduate degree in engineering (1960), a M.S. degree (1961) and a Ph.D. (1966) in atmospheric science from the University of Wisconsin-Madison. He was an aviation weather forecaster in the United States Air Force, stationed in France (1961–1963). He joined the University of Wisconsin-Madison faculty in 1966, was named Plaenert-Bascom Professor of Liberal Arts in 1990, and has been Professor Emeritus since 2002.

He has been a regular summer visiting researcher at the National Center for Atmospheric Research, Boulder Colorado, since 1975. He assisted in the early planning of international climate research meetings and reports as a member of the Joint WMO/ICSU Planning Staff and the WMO GARP Activities Office at the World Meteorological Organization, Geneva Switzerland (1974).

He has held one-year visiting appointments at the Meteorological Office of the United Kingdom, Bracknell, England (1968) and the Univ. of Bonn, Germany (1978), and shorter visiting appointments at the Max-Planck Institute for Biogeochemistry, Jena, Germany (1999); the Univ. of Alaska – Fairbanks (2004); and the Univ. of Western Australia, Perth (2009).

Gisela Hanebuth and John Kutzbach were married in Berlin, Germany on September 17, 1965. They both had careers as professors at University of Wisconsin-Madison. They have three children – Angela Kutzbach Currie, Katrina Kutzbach Martin, and Mark Kutzbach, and six grandchildren.

Scientific accomplishments 
Kutzbach pioneered the use of climate models to investigate the causes and effects of large-scale changes of climate of the past. He showed how changes in earth’s orbital parameters (eccentricity, precession, tilt) caused long-period changes in the tropical monsoons of Africa and Asia (1981,1982). He collaborated with an international group of paleoecologists, glaciologists, geomorphologists, and marine geologists in using field observations of past climate and environments in evaluating simulations of global climate from the last glacial maximum, 21000 years ago, to the present (1985, 1988, 1993a). This interdisciplinary project, the Cooperative Holocene Mapping Project (COHMAP), was among the early examples of broad international and interdisciplinary collaboration in studies of past climate, and was a forerunner of programs such as the Paleoclimate Model Intercomparison Project (PMIP).  

Kutzbach’s interdisciplinary collaboration continued in studies of earlier geologic eras using climate models to investigate the effects of large changes in earth’s orography (1989a, 2001), the altered land/ocean configuration of Pangea (1989b, 1993b), and long-period changes of orbital parameters  (2014).

In early years he helped introduce to the atmospheric sciences the use of empirical orthogonal functions (EOFs) to identify large-scale and long-period modes of atmospheric circulation (1970). In recent years he has contributed to studies of how humans have been influenced by climate and climatic change (2014), contributed to its change (2010, 2016), and face potential future impacts (2007a).  

He has authored or coauthored over 200 papers published in scientific journals. A symposium honoring his contributions was held in 2004; the collected papers of the symposium are published (2007b).

Awards and honors 
Kutzbach was elected a member of the National Academy of Sciences in 2006. He has also received the Roger Revelle Medal of the American Geophysical Union in 2006, the Milankovitch Medal of the European Geophysical Society in 2001, the Humboldt Research Award of the Alexander von Humboldt Foundation of Germany in 1976, the Distinguished Career Achievement Award of the American Quaternary Association in 2003, and the International Science and Technology Award of China in 2017. He was a Fellow of the American Association for the Advancement of Science, the American Geophysical Union, and the American Meteorological Society.

References

Selected publications 

 
 
 
 
 
 
 
 Wright, H.E. Jr, John E. Kutzbach, Thompson Webb III, William F. Ruddiman, Alayne Street-Perrott, and Patrick J. Bartlein, editors (1993a). “Global Climates since the Last Glacial Maximum”, Univ. of Minnesota Press. 584p.
 Kutzbach, J.E. and Ziegler, A.M. (1993b). Simulation of late Permian climate and biomes with an atmosphere-ocean model: comparisons with observations. Philosophical Transactions of the Royal Society of London, Series B, 341: 327–340.
 An, Z., J.E. Kutzbach, W. Prell, S. Porter (2001). Evolution of Asian monsoons and phased uplift of the Himalaya-Tibetan plateau since Late Miocene times. Nature 411: 62–66. 
 Williams, S. Jackson, J. Kutzbach (2007a). Projected distribution of novel and disappearing climates by 2100AD. Proceedings National Academy of Sciences 104: 5738–5742.
 Kutzbach, G., editor (2007b). Climate Variability and Change: Past, Present and Future; John E. Kutzbach Symposium, Center for Climatic Research, UW-Madison, 287p. Library of Congress Control Number 2007902354.
 Climate variability and change : past, present, and future : John E. Kutzbach Symposium

External links 
Homepage

1937 births
2021 deaths
American climatologists
University of Wisconsin–Madison faculty
University of Wisconsin–Madison College of Letters and Science alumni
Members of the United States National Academy of Sciences
University of Wisconsin–Madison College of Engineering alumni
People from Reedsburg, Wisconsin